The 2001 Fresno State football team represented California State University, Fresno in the 2001 NCAA Division I-A football season, and competed as a member of the Western Athletic Conference.  Led by head coach Pat Hill, the Bulldogs played their home games at Bulldog Stadium in Fresno, California.

They were quarterbacked by future #1 overall NFL Draft selection David Carr.

Schedule

Roster

Game summaries

at Colorado

No. 10 Oregon State

at No. 23 Wisconsin

at Tulsa

Louisiana Tech

at Colorado State

Boise State

at Hawaii

Rice

at SMU

at Nevada

San Jose State

Utah State

vs. Michigan State (Silicon Valley Classic)

Rankings

References

Fresno State
Fresno State Bulldogs football seasons
Fresno State Bulldogs football